Alexander Kuznetsov (born March 11, 1992) is a Russian professional ice hockey player. He is currently playing with Amur Khabarovsk of the Kontinental Hockey League (KHL).

Kuznetsov made his Kontinental Hockey League debut playing with Admiral Vladivostok during the 2013–14 season.

References

External links

1992 births
Living people
Admiral Vladivostok players
Amur Khabarovsk players
HC Dynamo Moscow players
Russian ice hockey forwards
HC Spartak Moscow players
Ice hockey people from Moscow